This is a list of national and regional football associations by date of foundation.

Europe (UEFA)

Notes

North America, Central America and the Caribbean (CONCACAF)

North American Zone (NAFU)

Central American Zone (UNCAF)

Caribbean Zone (CFU)

South America (CONMEBOL)

Africa (CAF)

Union of North African Football Federations (UNAF)

West Africa Football Union (WAFU)

Council for East and Central Africa Football Associations (CECAFA)

Central African Football Federations' Union (UNIFFAC)

Council of Southern Africa Football Associations (COSAFA)

Asia (AFC)

ASEAN Football Federation (AFF)

East Asian Football Federation (EAFF)

Central Asian Football Association (CAFA)

South Asian Football Federation (SAFF)

West Asian Football Federation (WAFF)

Oceania (OFC)

See also
List of football federations

References 

Association football-related lists